John Wesley Methodist Episcopal Church and Cemetery, also known as John Wesley United Methodist Church and Wesley Chapel, is a historic Methodist Episcopal church and cemetery located at West Warm Springs, Bath County, Virginia.  It was built by former slaves in 1873, and is a one-story, front-gabled, log church, clad in weatherboard with a stone foundation.  A frame vestibule with bell tower was added to the front of the church and a choir loft rear extension was added in 1923.  In 1982 a one-story, frame Sunday School addition, clad in vinyl siding was built by volunteers and added to the southeast elevation. The church represents the lone built representation of the first decades of the African-American settlement at West Warm Springs.

It was added to the National Register of Historic Places in 2013.

References

African-American history of Virginia
19th-century Methodist church buildings in the United States
Methodist churches in Virginia
Churches on the National Register of Historic Places in Virginia
Churches completed in 1873
Buildings and structures in Bath County, Virginia
National Register of Historic Places in Bath County, Virginia
1873 establishments in Virginia